Chalcoscirtus picinus is a jumping spider species in the genus Chalcoscirtus that lives in the United Arab Emirates. The female was first described in 2011.

References

Salticidae
Spiders described in 2011
Spiders of the Arabian Peninsula
Taxa named by Wanda Wesołowska